In geometry, the pentagonal orthobicupola is one of the Johnson solids. As the name suggests, it can be constructed by joining two pentagonal cupolae along their decagonal bases, matching like faces. A 36-degree rotation of one cupola before the joining yields a pentagonal gyrobicupola.

The pentagonal orthobicupola is the third in an infinite set of orthobicupolae.

Formulae
The following formulae for volume and surface area can be used if all faces are regular, with edge length a:

References

External links
 

Johnson solids